The Native Dancer Stakes is an American Thoroughbred horse race run annually at Laurel Park Racecourse in Laurel, Maryland. Raced in early January, it is open to horses age three and older and is contested on dirt over a distance of  mile. Its current purse is $75,000.

From 1966 to 2002, the race was known as the Native Dancer Handicap. It has been run at four different distances; for the first eleven years (from 1966 to 1976), the race was run at 6 furlongs, from 1977 to 1984 and in 2005 it was raced at a distance of  miles; in 1985 and from 2006 through 2010 the race was contested at its present distance of 1 mile; and from 1986 through 2003, it was run at a distance of  miles. The race was originally run at Bowie Race Track from 1966 through 1984.

The race is named in honor of Alfred G. Vanderbilt's Native Dancer. Native Dancer was the huge gray son of two of thoroughbred's top racing horses of the decade in Polynesian and Geisha. He was named Horse of the Year as a two-year-old and then named a repeat winner as a four-year-old. He also won the titles of Champion 2-year-old, Champion 3-year-old and Champion older horse in three consecutive years. Native Dancer won 21 of 22 races and earned $785,240. His 18 stakes victories included the Preakness Stakes, the Belmont Stakes and the Travers Stakes. Native Dancer's only loss was in the Kentucky Derby. Following a trip in which he was bumped three times, he finished second, a head behind Dark Star.

Upon his retirement, Native Dancer entered into stud at Vanderbilt's Sagamore Farm in Glyndon, Maryland, where he remained until his death in 1967. He was buried at Sagamore and was the sire of 45 stakes winners including Raise a Native (grandsire to Mr. Prospector), Alydar, Natalma and Northern Dancer.

Records 

Speed record: 
 6 furlongs - 1:09.00 - Tap The Tree (1974)
 1 mile - 1:34.80 -  Throng  (2008)
  miles - 1:40.20 - Jims Third Bolero (2005)
  miles - 1:48.40 - Gulf Reckoning (1996)

Most wins by an owner:
 2 -   Jack Owens   (1986 & 1987)

Most wins by a jockey:
 3 - Edgar Prado    (1991, 1992 & 1995)
 3 - Vincent Bracciale Jr.  (1974, 1981 & 1983)

Most wins by a trainer:
 3 - Michael Trombetta    (2006, 2013 & 2014)

Winners of the Native Dancer Stakes since 1966 

A # designates that the race was run in two divisions in 1978 and 1982.

See also 
 Native Dancer Stakes top three finishers
 Laurel Park Racecourse

References

 Native Dancer Stakes at Pedigree Query

Open middle distance horse races
Ungraded stakes races in the United States
Laurel Park Racecourse
Bowie Race Track
Horse races in Maryland
Recurring sporting events established in 1966